Silpa Bhirasri National Museum is a modern art museum in Bangkok, Thailand. It is on the grounds of the Fine Arts Department in Phra Nakhon District. The museum consists of two parts, one displaying contemporary arts, and the other belongings of Silpa Bhirasri, the father of modern Thai art.

External links
https://web.archive.org/web/20080526043302/http://www.national-gallery.go.th/silpabhirasri/index.html

Museums in Bangkok
National museums of Thailand
Phra Nakhon district
Art museums and galleries in Thailand